The Roman Catholic Archdiocese of Nagasaki is an archdiocese located in the city of Nagasaki in Japan.

History

 May 22, 1876: Established as Apostolic Vicariate of Southern Japan from the Apostolic Vicariate of Japan
 June 15, 1891: Promoted as Diocese of Nagasaki
 May 4, 1959: Promoted as Metropolitan Archdiocese of Nagasaki
 August 9, 1945: The Immaculate Conception Cathedral was destroyed by the second atomic bomb that was dropped over Japan. Many Catholics of Nagasaki died that day inside the church.

Leadership
Alfonso Pérez de Guzmán (17 May 1627 Appointed - 22 December 1670 Retired) 
Bernard-Thadée Petitjean, M.E.P. (22 May 1876 Appointed - 7 October 1884 Died) 
Jules-Alphonse Cousin, M.E.P. (16 June 1885 Appointed - 18 September 1911 Died) 
Jean-Claude Combaz, M.E.P. (3 June 1912 Appointed - 18 August 1926 Died) 
Januarius Kyunosuke Hayasaka (16 July 1927 Appointed - 5 February 1937 Resigned) 
Paul Aijirō Yamaguchi (15 September 1937 Appointed - 19 December 1968 Retired) 
(Cardinal) Joseph Asajiro Satowaki (19 December 1968 Appointed - 8 February 1990 Retired) 
Francis Xavier Kaname Shimamoto, Ist. del Prado (8 February 1990 Appointed - 31 August 2002 Died) 
Joseph Mitsuaki Takami, P.S.S. (17 Oct 2003 Appointed - 28 December 2021 Retired)
Peter Michiaki Nakamura (28 December 2021 Appointed – present)

Suffragan dioceses
 Fukuoka 福岡
 Kagoshima 鹿児島
 Naha 那覇
 Oita 大分

See also
 Catholic Church in Japan

References

External links
 GCatholic.org/GCatholic.org: The Metropolitan Archdiocese of Nagasaki, Japan
 Catholic Hierarchy
  Diocese website
 

Roman Catholic dioceses in Japan
Religious organizations established in 1876
Roman Catholic dioceses and prelatures established in the 19th century
Nagasaki
1876 establishments in Japan